FC Jazz  is a football club from Pori, Finland. It plays in the Finnish third tier Kakkonen. It was invented in 1934. FC Jazz has won two Finnish championships ( 1993 & 1996 ).

History

PPT 1934–1991 
FC Jazz was established in 1934 as Porin Pallo-Toverit (PPT for short) by 18 young men who had previously played football in the local sports club Pyrintö. The founders had strong labour movement background and PPT immediately joined the Finnish Workers' Sports Federation (TUL). PPT had also a section for bandy.

PPT played its first years in TUL regional series and after the second world war in TUL national divisions. The club made its debut in Finnish Football Association's national divisions in 1948 Suomensarja which was the second tier of Finnish football. After six more seasons in TUL series PPT joined the FA's divisions permanently in 1955 playing third or fourth tiers up to the 1980s. In 1982 PPT was promoted to 1. division and year later to the premier division Mestaruussarja.

FC Jazz 
In 1992 PPT changed its name for FC Jazz. The name was inspired by Pori Jazz festival, which is one of the most popular jazz festivals in Europe. FC Jazz won two Finnish championship titles in 1993 and 1996. The club was relegated to second tier in 2004, but the first team was dissolved 2005 as a result of financial problems.

FC Jazz youth section had been separated from the league organisation in 2002 and was known as FC Jazz-juniorit (FC Jazz Juniors). In 2006 club started in FA Satakunta district 5. division. Two years later FC Jazz-juniorit was promoted to third tier Kakkonen, which is the lowest national level in Finnish football. Since 2010 FC Jazz-juniorit has been again known as FC Jazz. In 2013 FC Jazz was promoted to Ykkönen after beating Ekenäs IF 4–2 on aggregate in the promotion playoffs.

Name changes 
Porin Pallo-Toverit (PPT, 1934–1992)
FC Jazz (1992–2004)
FC Jazz-juniorit (FC Jazz-j, 2005–2009)
FC Jazz (2010–present)

Honours 

Finnish Championship:
Winners (2): 1993, 1996
Finnish Cup:
Runners-up (1): 1995
Finnish League Cup:
Runners-up (1): 1994

Domestic competition record

European competitions 
UEFA Champions League:

UEFA Cup:

UEFA Intertoto Cup:

Current squad

Former players 

All following players who have represented FC Jazz have been capped at least once by their respective national team's first squad.

References

External links 

FC Jazz Official Website

 
1934 establishments in Finland
Association football clubs established in 1934
Football clubs in Finland
Sport in Pori
Sport in Satakunta